The Viterra Saskatchewan Scotties Tournament of Hearts is the Saskatchewan provincial women's curling tournament. The tournament is run by CURLSASK, the provincial curling association. The winning team represents Saskatchewan at the Scotties Tournament of Hearts.

Past winners
(National champions in bold)

References

External link
Provincial Champions - CurlSask

Scotties Tournament of Hearts provincial tournaments
Curling in Saskatchewan